John Andrew Francis (born 21 November 1963) is an English retired professional association footballer who played as a striker.
He now operates within the academy side of Burnley FC.

References

1963 births
Living people
Association football forwards
Burnley F.C. players
Cambridge United F.C. players
English Football League players
English footballers
Footballers from Dewsbury
Halifax Town A.F.C. players
Scunthorpe United F.C. players
Sheffield United F.C. players
Wakefield F.C. players
Whitby Town F.C. players